Festival of the Arts may refer to:

 Festival of the Arts (California), an art festival held annually in Laguna Beach, California
 Festival of the Arts (Grand Rapids), an art festival held annually in Grand Rapids, Michigan
 Detroit Festival of the Arts, an art festival held from 1986 to 2009 in Detroit, Michigan